Night Boat to Dublin is a 1946 British thriller film directed and co-written by Lawrence Huntington.  It stars Robert Newton, Raymond Lovell, Guy Middleton, Muriel Pavlow and Herbert Lom.

Plot
During the Second World War, a captured German spy (Marius Goring) is executed at the Tower of London, without revealing the whereabouts of Professor Hansen, a refugee Swedish scientist in Britain. He is believed to be unwittingly passing information on the atomic bomb to Germany through the neutral Irish Free State. British intelligence attempts to locate him and break this link.

Two intelligence officers, Captain Grant and Captain Wilson, travel incognito on the overnight ferry to Dublin. They observe the German contact, Keitel, and their suspicion falls on lawyer Paul Faber. Grant manages to get a clerical job in Faber's London office, using a false identity. He allows himself to be exposed as an ex-army officer who's gone AWOL, and allows himself to be blackmailed by Faber into doing a number of illegal jobs. These include a marriage of convenience to Marion, a young Austrian girl who is desperate to acquire British nationality; also the theft of some radioactive items from a docks warehouse.

Eventually, the trail leads Grant, Hunter and the police to the fictional village of Hunstable in Devon, and from there to a cliff-edge mansion where Hansen is being hidden. A showdown in a sea cave under the mansion leaves the police triumphant.

Grant is directed to a room where his wife, Marion, is held. She expects a spy is entering and breaks a vase on his head. The film end with her kneeling next to him saying "Oh David".

Cast

 Robert Newton as Captain David Grant  
 Raymond Lovell as Paul Faber  
 Guy Middleton as Captain Toby Hunter  
 Muriel Pavlow as Marion Decker  
 Herbert Lom as Keitel  
 John Ruddock as Bowman  
 Martin Miller as Professor Hansen  
 Brenda Bruce as Lily Leggett  
 Gerald Case as Inspector Emerson  
 Scott Forbes as Lieutenant Allen  
 Leslie Dwyer as George Leggett  
 Valentine Dyall as Sir George Bell
 Marius Goring as Frederick Jannings
 Olga Lindo as Mrs. Coleman  
 Joan Maude as Sidney Vane
 Hay Petrie as the Station Master     
 Lawrence O'Madden as Captain Wilson
 Stuart Lindsell as 	Inspector Martin
 Gordon McLeod as Inspector Longhurst 
 Derek Elphinstone as Naval Surgeon
 Bruce Gordon as Hood
 Carroll Gibbons as 	Self
 Edmundo Ros as Self
 George Hirste as 	Station Official
 J. Hubert Leslie as Ticket Collector 
 Wilfred Hyde-White as Taxi driver

Production
Filming took place in July 1945. It was shot at the Welwyn Studios in Hertfordshire with sets designed by the art director Charles Gilbert.

Reception
 C.A. Lejeune in The Observer said the film was "effectively done in a small way and has the frankly preposterous zest of a boys' adventure story."

References

External links

Night Boat to Dublin at BFI
Review of film at Variety

1946 films
1940s spy thriller films
British spy thriller films
World War II spy films
Films set in England
Films set in Ireland
Films set in London
Seafaring films
Films directed by Lawrence Huntington
British black-and-white films
1940s English-language films
1940s British films